Maddalena Crippa (born  4 September 1957) is an Italian film, television and stage actress. She won a David di Donatello for Best Supporting Actress for her role in Academy Award nominee Three Brothers by Francesco Rosi.

Life and career 
Born in Besana in Brianza, Crippa started to act at young age in an amateur dramatics with her father and brothers. At 17 years old, at exams to attend the drama school of the Piccolo Teatro in Milan, the director Giorgio Strehler was impressed by her acting skills and gave her a role in his adaptation of Carlo Goldoni's Il campiello (1975). From then, Crippa  started a busy career in theater, working among others with Giancarlo Cobelli, Luca Ronconi and her husband Peter Stein. She is also active in TV-series and in films.

Miniseries 
 1976: La casa nova of Carlo Goldoni, director Luigi Squarzina
 1976: I due gemelli veneziani of Carlo Goldoni, director Luigi Squarzina
 1976: Così per gioco, regia di Leonardo Cortese

Filmography 
 1976: Aut aut. Cronaca di una rapina
 1981: Tre fratelli, dir. Francesco Rosi
 1982: No grazie, il caffè mi rende nervoso, dir Lodovico Gasparini
 1985: Juke Box, dir. Valerio Jalongo
 1986: Aurelia, dir. Giorgio Molteni
 1987: L'attrazione, dir. Mario Gariazzo
 1990: Non più di uno, dir. Roberto Pelosso
 1993: Berlino '39, dir. Sergio Sollima
 1998: Giochi d'equilibrio, dir. Amedeo Fago
 1998: Il commissario Rex, episode ... e tutto ricomincia
 1998: Film, dir. Laura Belli
 1999: Viol@, dir. Donatella Maiorca
 2000: Onorevoli detenuti, dir. Giancarlo Planta
 2011: In carne e ossa, dir. Christian Angeli
 2016: Io non mi arrendo, dir. Enzo Monteleone (2016)

References

External links 
 

Italian film actresses
Italian television actresses
Italian stage actresses
1957 births
People from the Province of Monza e Brianza
Living people